Luis de Mendoza (died 2 April 1520) was a Spanish mariner and explorer.

Biography 
Mendoza was a member of Magellan's circumnavigation of the world, the initial captain of the Victoria.  He was appointed by Charles I of Spain on March 30, 1519 as  treasurer of the navy "for the discovery of the Spices", that had the purpose of finding a route to the Spice Islands within the limits of the Spanish demarcation to the Spice Islands. These limits had been agreed with Portugal in the Treaty of Tordesillas of 1494, establishing a line of demarcation that divided the world between both crowns.

He was killed while leading a mutiny against Magellan in Patagonia, stabbed to death in the throat and head by a Magellan loyalist.

References

Footnotes

Bibliography

 
 

Mutineers against Magellan
1520 deaths
Deaths by stabbing in Argentina